War Galoh is a town in the north-central Mudug region of Somalia.

References
Wargalo

Populated places in Mudug
Galmudug